General Motors do Brasil is the largest subsidiary of General Motors in South America, one of the oldest and largest car producers in Brazil.

Founded in 1925 and initially located in the historic district of Ipiranga, São Paulo, the company assembled cars using imported parts from the United States.

History 

Initially operating in a rented warehouse, GM do Brasil opened its first plant in 1930 in São Caetano do Sul, São Paulo.

In 1958, a second factory was opened in São José dos Campos, officially inaugurated a year later by Juscelino Kubitschek, the President of Brazil at the time, for die casting and other cars assemblies.

GM introduced its first car in the country, the Chevrolet Opala, in 1968.

In 1973, GM launched the Chevrolet Chevette, which has accumulated sales exceeding 1.2 million units. It was replaced by the Chevrolet Corsa in 1994, the first economy car with electronic fuel injection in Brazil, after tests were conducted near Indaiatuba.

From 1968 until 2005, GM used Opel-developed cars badged as "Chevrolet".

In July 2000 launched the Industrial Complex of Gravataí in Rio Grande do Sul, one of the world's most modern factories.

After globalisation and selling of Opel to Peugeot, vehicles like the Onix were made. After that, most designs came ready from Warren, mainly pickup trucks Saic-GM in Shanghai, China. Other cars were the Chevrolet Agile, Chevrolet Meriva, Chevrolet Kadett, Chevrolet Monza, Chevrolet Zafira among others.

In 2005, GM do Brasil sold a total of 365,259 vehicles, 21.3% of the Brazilian market. The percentage was 22.6% in the SUV and commercial segment. The company's total production reached 559,345 units when counting exports.

In 2005, exports reached a value of US$ 1.6 billion, for the shipment of 114,994 complete knock-down (CKD) units and 125,678 vehicles exported to some 40 countries around the world. The main market for exports was Mexico, followed by Argentina, Venezuela, South Africa and other Latin American countries.

In the social area, GM do Brasil focused activities through the General Motors Institute, created in 1993, its mission is to rescue the citizenship of children, youths and adults from poor communities, which are located especially close to industrial plants of the company. Its shares are primarily in education.

In 2019, GM do Brasil sold 475,684 vehicles, an increase of 10% over the previous calendar year, surpassing China in sales. The last time sales exceed the Asian country was 2013, when GM sold 643,100 units in Brazil.

The investment was first announced in 2019. Despite this, sales dropped 28.5% to 242,108 vehicles.

In December 2021, GM South America announced that it will hire around 250 engineers from various specialties to work mainly in the areas of the São Caetano do Sul Technological Centre, such as bodywork and structure, exterior, interior, chassis, engine, transmission, electronics, controllers, software and virtual simulation. An expansion, part of the 2020-2024 investment plan is ongoing.

Products 

(all of them under the Chevrolet brand):

Locally produced¨
Onix
Montana
Spin
S10 (since 2012)
Tracker 
TrailBlazer (since 2012)

Imported 
Bolt (on hold, due to chip shortage) – From the USA 
Cruze (sedan and hatchback) – From Argentina
Camaro (coupé and convertible) – From the USA (on hold)
Equinox – From Mexico

References

External links

 

Car manufacturers of Brazil
Brazil
Brazilian subsidiaries of foreign companies
Automotive industry in Brazil
Manufacturing companies based in São Paulo